The Confederate Army was the land army of the Peru-Bolivian Confederation.

History
The army was preceded by an alliance between Peruvian troops loyal to Luis José de Orbegoso, then constitutional president of Peru, and the Bolivian Army of ally and president of Bolivia, Andrés de Santa Cruz, who crossed the border into Peru at Orbegoso's invitation during the civil war that broke out after political instability and a coup d'état in 1835 by Felipe Santiago Salaverry. After the alliance's triumph in 1836, assemblies were soon established to make way for the creation of the Confederation, including its army.

The army initially saw success against the first military expedition carried out by Peruvian dissidents in Arequipa, forcing them to sign a peace treaty, but was ultimately defeated in the second expedition's Battle of Yungay, which ended the War of the Confederation, and was thus dissolved alongside the Confederation. It had also been involved in a conflict against the Argentine Confederation in the Tarija War since 1837.

See also
Confederate Navy (Peru–Bolivian Confederation)

References

Bibliography
 

Peru–Bolivian Confederation
Military of Bolivia
Military history of Bolivia
Military of Peru
Military history of Peru
Disbanded armed forces